24105 Broughton, provisional designation , is a background asteroid from the inner regions of the asteroid belt, approximately  in diameter. The assumed S-type asteroid was discovered on 9 November 1999, by American amateur astronomer Charles W. Juels at the Fountain Hills Observatory  in Arizona, United States. It has a rotation period of 15.9 hours and was named after Australian amateur astronomer John Broughton.

Orbit and classification 

Broughton is non-family asteroid from the main belt's background population, located near the region occupied by the Flora family, one of the largest clans of stony asteroids. It orbits the Sun in the inner asteroid belt at a distance of 2.2–2.4 AU once every 3 years and 7 months (1,308 days; semi-major axis of 2.34 AU). Its orbit has an eccentricity of 0.04 and an inclination of 7° with respect to the ecliptic.

Naming 

This minor planet was named in honor of Australian amateur astronomer John Broughton (born 1952), a prolific discoverer of minor planets who received a "Shoemaker NEO Grant" in 2002. The approved naming citation was published by the Minor Planet Center on 26 November 2004.

Physical characteristics

Lightcurves 

In October 2013, a rotational lightcurve of Broughton was obtained from photometric observations in the R-band by astronomers at the Palomar Transient Factory in California. Lightcurve analysis gave a rotation period of  hours with a brightness variation of 0.34 magnitude.

Diameter and albedo 

The Collaborative Asteroid Lightcurve Link assumes an albedo of 0.24 – derived from 8 Flora, the family's largest member and namesake – and calculates a diameter of 3.65 kilometers with an absolute magnitude of 14.36.

References

External links 
 Asteroid Lightcurve Database (LCDB), query form (info )
 Dictionary of Minor Planet Names, Google books
 Asteroid 24105 Broughton, at the Small bodies Data Ferret
 Discovery Circumstances: Numbered Minor Planets (20001)-(25000) – Minor Planet Center
 
 

024105
Discoveries by Charles W. Juels
Named minor planets
19991109